Philippine Nazarene College (PNC), formerly known as Luzon Nazarene Bible College (LNBC), is an undergraduate-level institution located at La Trinidad, Benguet in the Philippines. Operating as Nazarene Bible College from 1952 to 1969, PNC is a theological college in the Wesleyan theological tradition and affiliated with the Church of the Nazarene through its Division of World Mission.

On November 7, 2019, Rev. Allan A. Prado was elected as 12th President after serving as the Officer-in-charge for the past three years.

External links
 

Universities and colleges in Benguet
Bible colleges
Educational institutions established in 1952
Protestant schools in the Philippines
Seminaries and theological colleges in the Philippines
Universities and colleges affiliated with the Church of the Nazarene
1952 establishments in the Philippines